The Evangelical Free Church in Sweden ( is a Baptist Christian denomination in Sweden. The headquarters is in Örebro.

History
Evangeliska Frikyrkan was founded in 1997 as a merge of the Örebro Mission (Örebromissionen, founded in 1892 as Örebro Missionary Society), the Free Baptist Union (Fribaptistsamfundet, founded in 1872) and the Holiness Union (Helgelseförbundet, founded in 1887). 

In 2011, it had 32,223 members. 

As of 2015, it has 304 churches and  34,400  members.

References

External links
Official website

Christian organizations established in 1997
Baptist denominations in Europe
Evangelicalism in Sweden
1997 establishments in Sweden
Christian denominations in Sweden